The United States Military Academy (USMA) is an undergraduate college in West Point, New York that educates and commissions officers for the United States Army during the American Civil War. This list is drawn from alumni of the Military Academy who served as general officers in the Union Army (US Army). This includes William Tecumseh Sherman (class of 1840), Abner Doubleday (class of 1842), Ulysses S. Grant (class of 1843), George Crook (class of 1852), Philip Sheridan (class of 1853). This also includes six recipients of the Medal of Honor: Rufus Saxton (class of 1849), Eugene Asa Carr (class of 1850), John Schofield (class of 1853), Oliver O. Howard (class of 1854), Alexander S. Webb (class of 1855), and Adelbert Ames (class of 1861).



List
Note: "Class year" refers to the class year of each alumnus, which usually is the same year the person graduated. However, in times of war, classes often graduate early.
ex' after the class year indicates the alumnus is a non-graduating member of that class.

See also
List of Confederate States Army officers educated at the United States Military Academy

References
General

Inline citations

West Point
Academy alumni, famous list
United States Army officers
U
Alu
Civ